The Men's Javelin Throw event at the 2005 World Championships in Athletics was held at the Helsinki Olympic Stadium on August 9 and August 10.

Medalists

Schedule
All times are Eastern European Time (UTC+2)

Abbreviations
All results shown are in metres

Startlist

Records

Qualification

Group A

Group B

Final

Notes

External links
IAAF results, heats
IAAF results, final
todor66
koti.welho

Javelin
Javelin throw at the World Athletics Championships